Cerberus Valley is an upland valley between Mount Cerberus and Eurus Ridge in the eastern Olympus Range, McMurdo Dry Valleys. The valley opens north to Victoria Valley. It was named by the Advisory Committee on Antarctic Names in 2004, in association with Mount Cerberus.

References
 

Valleys of Victoria Land
McMurdo Dry Valleys